Puno District is one of fifteen districts of the Puno Province in the Puno Region of Peru. Its seat is Puno.

See also 
 Inka Tunuwiri
 Mayqu Amaya